Acanthogonatus tolhuaca is a mygalomorph spider of Chile, named after its type locality: Tolhuaca, Malleco, Region IX (de la Araucania). This species differs from A. mulchen in its wider sternum, smaller size, and the spermathecae having a more pronounced notch; from A. brunneus, it differs in the uniformly coloured abdomen.

Description
Female: total length ; cephalothorax length , width ; cephalic region length , width ; fovea width ; medial ocular quadrangle length , width ; labium length , width ; sternum length , width . Its cephalic region is wide but low, while its fovea is slightly procurved, with a small posterior notch. Its labium possesses no cuspules. A serrula is present on the anterior face of the lobe. Its sternal sigilla is small and oval (less elongated than A. Mulchen). Chelicerae: rastellum is absent. The spermathecal notch is more pronounced than in A. Mulchen. The entire spider is a reddish-blackish brown colour, while the abdomen has a paler anterodorsal spot.

Distribution
Only in Malleco Province.

References

External links

ADW entry

Pycnothelidae
Spiders of South America
Spiders described in 1995
Endemic fauna of Chile